Dear Mr. Wonderful (also known as Ruby's Dream in some US video releases) is a German movie starring Joe Pesci.

Plot
Ruby Dennis (Joe Pesci) is a small-time lounge singer who owns a bowling alley. The film follows his attempts to make it big while struggling against the mob and finding romance with Sharon (Ivy Ray Browning). Dennis lives with his sister, Paula (Karen Ludwig), and her son, Raymond (Evan Handler). Paula quits her job and runs off to help the poor, leaving Dennis to keep Raymond away from a life of crime. Ruby ventures toward a spiritual crisis, something that is off-kilter to his surroundings.

Cast
 Joe Pesci as Ruby Dennis
 Karen Ludwig as Paula
 Frank Vincent as Louie
 Ed O'Ross as Glenn 
 Richard S. Castellano as FBI Agent
 Ivy Ray Browning as Sharon
 Larry Rapp as Arnold
 Joseph Rigano as Artie
 Gene Ruffini as Jimmy
 Ben Dova as Ben
 Dominick Grieco as Lenny
 Paul Herman as "Hesh"
 Evan Handler as Ray
 Ronald Maccone as Maurice
 Tony Martin as Cameo Role

Awards
Peter Lilienthal, the film's director, won "Outstanding Individual Achievement: Direction" in the 1983 German Film Awards.

External links

References

1980s crime comedy-drama films
West German films
English-language German films
1982 films
Films directed by Peter Lilienthal
Films set in the United States
German crime comedy-drama films
1982 comedy films
1982 drama films
1980s English-language films
1980s German films